Alice's Adventures Under Ground is a 2016 one-act opera by Gerald Barry to his own libretto, based on Lewis Carroll's 1865 children's book Alice's Adventures in Wonderland (the original manuscript of which had the title of Alice's Adventures Under Ground) and its 1871 sequel Alice Through the Looking-Glass. First performed in a concert staging at the Walt Disney Concert Hall, Los Angeles on 22 November 2016 (a performance repeated with the same cast and conductor, Thomas Adès, at the  Barbican Centre in London a few days later), it received its stage premiere at the Royal Opera House on 3 February 2020. The staging was a joint production by the Royal Opera House, Irish National Opera and Dutch National Opera, and was directed by Antony McDonald.

The 54 roles in the opera are sung by a cast of seven.

Roles

Synopsis
The following synopsis is in accordance with the Royal Opera House production, 2020.

The opera, which is in a single act and lasts for just under an hour, is a sequence of episodes or parts of episodes from both Alice's Adventures in Wonderland  and Alice Through the Looking-Glass. It begins with Alice falling through the Rabbit Hole and meeting many of the characters of the first book, including the White Rabbit,  the Mad Hatter, the Mock Turtle and the King, Queen and Knave of Hearts. Some of the poetry from the books also features, including "Jabberwocky" which is sung in versions in Russian (to the tune of "It's a Long Way to Tipperary"), French and German. Moving to Looking Glass Land, Alice moves across the chessboard, meeting among others Humpty Dumpty and Tweedledum and Tweedledee, becoming a queen when she reaches the eighth square.

References

Notes

Sources
Royal Opera House (2020a). Programme, Alice's Adventures Under Ground
Royal Opera house (2020b). Cast list, Alice's Adventures Under Ground

2016 operas
Operas
Operas by Gerald Barry
Music based on Alice in Wonderland
English-language operas
Opera world premieres at the Royal Opera House
One-act operas